Elachista plagiaula is a moth in the family Elachistidae. It was described by Edward Meyrick in 1938. It is found in New Zealand.

The wingspan is 12–15 mm. The costal area of the forewings is variably tinged or suffused with white. There is a white subdorsal streak from the base to the tornus, leaving a narrow grey dorsal streak. The hindwings are grey.

References

Moths described in 1938
plagiaula
Moths of New Zealand
Endemic fauna of New Zealand
Taxa named by Edward Meyrick
Endemic moths of New Zealand